Carry On Breathing is an album from UK group Cassetteboy.

Overview

This is Cassetteboy's latest album, released on Barry's Bootlegs in 2008. It follows the life of a person, from birth to death. It contains the usual mix of samples from a variety of sources, including EastEnders, Doctor Who, American Dad!, The Simpsons, and many other samples taken from British Television and radio broadcasts. Cassetteboy disclosed the names of the band members shortly before the release of this album. Three of the track titles refer to the book Earth Inc., written by Michael Bollen.

Track listing

 Brokeback Building Site  	                 1:08  	
 The Skilling Bike 	                         1:00 	
 Reading Pain in the Face of a Duck 	         0:38 	
 All The Forks, Forky Fork 	                 1:23 	
 Standupsitdowngetupfaffaround 	         0:27 	
 The Lead Thief 	                         2:09 	
 Fancy a Game of Fuck You Palin? 	         0:17 	
 Dangerous Megathumbs 	                 0:16 	
 Flapjack Your Body 	                         0:43 	
 Chris's Printer 	                         0:42 	
 Brackish Water 	                         2:36 	
 Revenge of the Pencock                    	 0:22 	
 Next Level 	                                 1:02 	
 You Know When You've Been Winked at By Euback's Winking Winky 0:19 	
 I Love Cat 	                                 0:28 	
 Porkpienapple 	                         0:25 	
 Salvador Dahlin Wahlin 	                 0:06 	
 Bullhang in the Bristol Channel 	         0:12 	
 Dingy Veils, Rumpled Gown 	                 0:48 	
 Old People's Bums Are Very Flat 	         1:26 	
 Sidney Darken 	                         0:55 	
 Full Plastic Helmet Full Mental Jacket  	 1:10 	
 Ever Punishing Krow 	                         0:52 	
 I Love Dog 	                                 1:47 	
 Crapboasts 	                                 2:19 	
 Dude Where's My Car                  	 1:11 	
 My Bum & The Bi-Mums 	                 0:36 	
 Dwhoooo! 	                                 0:59 	
 Kajsa 	                                 1:44 	
 I Know Michael Jackson 	                 0:11 	
 Furtive Movements of the Skulking Muslim 	 0:51 	
 The Pitiful Door 	                         0:26 	
 Can I Have The Data? 	                 0:47 	
 Andy Townsend's Crappy Computer 	         0:11 	
 I Like Things 	                         0:40 	
 Do You Remember That Film With Sigourney Weaver? 0:51 	
 Grunder II 	                                 0:14 	
 Yeah, Snake Oil                         	 2:17 	
 The Boss's Beef Melon 	                 0:11 	
 I Am The Guv'nor, You Deal With Me 	         0:38 	
 One of Us Has Written A Novel          	 1:24 	
 It's Called 'Earth Inc' 	                 0:19 	
  978 0556105 30     0:43 	
 Have You Ever Seen Fish And Chips Like These? 1:56 	
 A Snake Is Not An Animal                    	 0:17 	
 Chelmsfail 	                                 0:19 	
 You're Pickin The Bones Out          	 0:46 	
 Cockalainie                            	 1:07 	
 Sugary Shearer 	                         0:46 	
 They'll Never Succeed in Taking Over The Government of France 	0:15 	
 Mum & Dad 0:21 	
 I'll Have A Thanks Very Much          	                        0:38 	
 Bleak Sieve                          	                        1:03 	
 Threads                                	                        2:06 	
 Nice Hair Sieve                                              	0:32 	
 Involuntary Dolphins 	                                        0:26 	
 A Duck Is One Mean Machine              	                        3:05 	
 Blow A Dog's Hair Out                    	                        1:31 	
 Gonashvili                             	 1:32 	
 The Hissing Butt                        	 0:28 	
 Mindprobe Sieve                       	 0:56 	
 Black Crunchy Nut Man                    	 0:47 	
 Kolme Kitaraa                        	 0:14 	
 My Wife Kracked A Little Gig Off in Kraków 	 0:29 	
 Gluey Stepmum 	                         0:56 	
 Taking The Noro on the Chin           	 2:22 	
 Acropolis Now                            	 0:11 	
 We Went To Chicago We Did             	 0:41 	
 Wheelchair Sieve 	                         0:20 	
 Taking The Bedlington Terrier for a Walk 	 0:24 	
 Duckdiamond 	                                 1:00 	
 Knocked Up A Lil Grey Pigs Face Thing 	 0:22 	
 Chris Moyles Is Not A Paedophile 	         0:36 	
 The Salmon Meal 	                         0:53 	
 Down at the Quiz 	                         0:23 	
 Panickin Skywalker 	                         0:09 	
 Foameyes 735 	                         0:55 	
 Giving Up (Again) 	                         1:49 	
 He Had Money All Along 	                 0:48 	
 Hubcap Ernie 	                         0:29 	
 Snow Dalek 	                                 0:15 	
 A Couple of Old School Mates 	         0:56 	
 Anybody Wanna Do Our Next Album For Us? 	 0:52 	
 The Boardgame That Crashed 	                 1:01 	
 I Couldn't Tell You That I Loved You Enough 	 0:41 	
 What? You're Gonna Kill Me? Down The Phone? 	 1:21 	
 This Track Has No Title 	                 1:19

External links
 http://www.discogs.com/Cassetteboy-Carry-On-Breathing/release/1352409

2008 albums
Cassetteboy albums